WQCH (1590 AM) is a radio station broadcasting a country music format. It is licensed to LaFayette, Georgia, United States, and serves the Chattanooga area.  The station is owned by Radix Broadcasting, Inc. and features programming from AP Radio.

From 1954 to 1988, WQCH operated with the call letters WLFA.

FM Translator
In addition to the main station at 1590 kHz, WQCH programming is relayed to an FM translator in order to provide 24 hour coverage.  The AM frequency broadcasts during the daytime hours only (approximately sunrise to sunset).  An FM signal also gives the listener high fidelity sound.

References

External links

QCH
Radio stations established in 1954
1954 establishments in Georgia (U.S. state)
QCH